He's in Again is a 1918 American silent comedy film starring Billy West and also featuring Oliver Hardy. It is one of the several films where West adopts Chaplin's tramp persona.

Plot

A Chaplin type figure (Billy West) tries to evade a bouncer on a club door to get in to see the female floor show. He eventually dodges past him. As a hidden joke in the first scene a board proclaims "Girls Direct From Paris" then has a disclaimer "Paris Texas".

Once inside the waiter (Hardy) gives him a seat at a small table and offers him the menu. He rips up the menu and asks for a large beer. The waiter brings it but wants his 5 cents before it is drunk. As the tramp has no money he is ejected, but he circles around the bouncer and comes in again. He heads back for a sip of beer and is ejected again - more forcibly. On his third attempt Hardy lifts him off the ground and carries him out with the other customers laughing. He makes in clear that he must not return.

Back inside the boss asks the waiter what is going on. The boss tells the waiter to bring the tramp back in to work for the 5 cents and gives him an apron. He goes to work at the bar and is quickly conned out of a drink. Next a woman waits while he shakes a cocktail but it is he who shakes and the cocktail stays still. The woman, one of the dancers, quits.

Next a dancer, Beda Thara (imitating Theda Bara), comes on the central stage. She flirts with a drunk man. She dances with a pretend snake. She pretends to be bitten on the breast by the snake and dies like Cleopatra. The drunk man asks the manager to get her to join at his table. As she was wearing a veil the tramp is able to disguise himself and is sent instead. He sits with the drunk and lights his pipe. He puffs away then the tramp borrows it and has a few puffs through his veil.

Next he serves a young couple, fondling the girl's ringlets while he takes the order. He disapproves that the man is trying to get the girl to drink strong spirits. He pours the girl's drink away while the man looks away. He then orders two more shots. This time the tramp swaps the girls drink for a shot of dark root beer, but the man spots the swap. The man leaves the table and the tramp sits with the girl and sympathises. We see the story of how the man met the girl, carrying her schoolbooks.

The next act comes on stage: boxing. We are told Kid Bogan a prizefighter has not turned up. The boss offers the tramp $5 to fight in his place. He has to fight Battling Gink - the man who was with the girl. The tramp has a bad start - sitting on the wet sponge. The Gink dances around but the tramp gets one punch in before the bell. In the second round he accidentally head-butts the Gink and knocks him out. Back in the corner Hardy brings him a tray of food. Hardy puts pepper on his glove and the third round begins. He keeps on rubbing the glove into the Gink's nose. The Gink is knocked out a second time.

The tramp gets the prize money. The Gink rejoins the girl and takes out his own bottle of spirits from his pocket. He tries to kiss her. The tramp grabs him and knocks him out again.

Cast
 Billy West as A Customer
 Oliver Hardy as Head Waiter (as Babe Hardy)
 Leo White as The Prize Fighter
 Ethelyn Gibson
 Charley Chase as Piano Player (as Charles Parrott)
 Bud Ross as A Drunk (as Budd Ross)
 Stanton Heck

See also
 List of American films of 1918
 Oliver Hardy filmography

References

External links

1918 films
1918 short films
American silent short films
American black-and-white films
1918 comedy films
Silent American comedy films
American comedy short films
1910s American films